Cristian Ricardo Lucio Mijares (born 2 October 1981) is a Mexican former professional boxer. He is a two-time super flyweight champion, having held the unified WBC and WBA (Unified) titles from 2006 to 2008 and the IBF title from 2010 to 2011.

Early life 
Mijares comes from a large boxing family. His younger brother is a lightweight prospect Ricardo Mijares and his uncle is a former world title contender Vicente Mijares.

Professional career 
On 3 June 2006, Mijares knocked out Adalberto Davila in six rounds for the Mexican super flyweight title.

WBC super flyweight championship 
On 18 September 2006, he defeated former champion Katsushige Kawashima for the interim WBC title, by a split decision. The official scorers saw it 114-113, 113-114, 114-113. He was later promoted to full champion after reigning champion Masamori Tokuyama vacated his title on 6 December 2006, in anticipation of retiring. In 2007, he defeated Katsushige Kawashima in a rematch via a tenth round knock out.

On 14 April 2007, Mijares defended his title by beating two time light flyweight champion Jorge Arce by unanimous decision in a particularly bloody match for Arce, who saw his first defeat since 1999. Mijares won the fight by a wide margin, with the official judges scoring the match 119-109, 118-110, 117-111, all in favor of Mijares.

Mijares returned just 3 months later, beating Teppei Kikui, dominating and then stopping him in 10 rounds in front of his hometown crown in Mexico. Mijares made quick work of obscure journeyman Franck Gorjux stopping him in just 1 round.
	 	
In February 2008, Mijares returned to the United States and was featured on a HBO pay-per-view under card against flyweight Olympian Jose Navarro, the early rounds belonged to Mijares, while the middle rounds were evenly matched with Mijares finishing strong in the later rounds. Mijares retained his title with a Split Decision victory.

WBA super flyweight championship 
Mijares unified his WBC super flyweight title by defeating WBA Champion Alexander Muñoz via split decision on 17 May 2008. After several close opening rounds, Mijares took control with his crisp counterpunching and brilliant defense, with the win being secured by many dominant late rounds in which he managed to hurt Munoz. This win made him the WBA (Unified) champion. With the victory, Mijares earned a spot in the top 10 pound for pound list.

Mijares made a return on 30 August in Mexico, where he defended his two crowns against a 38-year-old former WBC flyweight champion, Chatchai Sasakul. Sasakul had lost his title to Manny Pacquiao in 1998 and had not fought any world class opposition since. Mijares easily controlled the contest with his jab and counterpunching, eventually stopping Sasakul in round 3 after dropping him in the previous round.

Mijares was most recently knocked out by Vic Darchinyan in the 9th round, losing his WBC and WBA super flyweight titles to the Armenian-born Australian in a surprising upset. Although he had three defeats prior to his bout with Darchinyan, this was the first time Mijares had been stopped.

He went up in weight and challenged Nehomar Cermeño for the interim WBA bantamweight title on 14 March 2009. Mijares lost by split decision. He fought Cermeño again on 12 September 2009 for that same title but lost by unanimous decision. Two days later, Mijares announced his retirement from boxing.

IBF super flyweight championship 
On 11 December 2010, Mijares became a two-time super flyweight champion by beating IBF super flyweight champion Juan Alberto Rosas.

In May 2011, Cristian made his first defence, a victory over contender Carlos Rueda.

Retirement
On 16 June 2018, Mijares headlined his retirement card before a partisan crowd at Gómez Palacio, losing by third round knockout to Wilfredo Vázquez Jr. of Puerto Rico.

Professional boxing record

Titles in boxing 
Major world titles
WBC super flyweight champion (115 lbs)
WBA (Unified) super flyweight champion (115 lbs)
IBF super flyweight Champion (115 lbs)

Interim titles
WBC interim super flyweight champion (115 lbs)

Regional/International titles
Mexico super flyweight champion (115 lbs)
WBA Fedelatin super flyweight champion (115 lbs)
NABF bantamweight champion (118 lbs)
WBC Silver featherweight champoon (126 lbs)

See also 

List of Mexican boxing world champions
Notable boxing families
List of WBC world champions
List of WBA world champions
List of IBF world champions
List of super flyweight boxing champions

References

External links 

|-

Boxers from Durango
People from Gómez Palacio, Durango
World boxing champions
World Boxing Council champions
World Boxing Association champions
International Boxing Federation champions
World super-flyweight boxing champions
Bantamweight boxers
Super-flyweight boxers
Southpaw boxers
1981 births
Living people
Mexican male boxers